A bond vigilante is a bond market investor who protests against monetary or fiscal policies considered inflationary by selling bonds, thus increasing yields.

In the bond market, prices move inversely to yields. When investors perceive that inflation risk or credit risk is rising they demand higher yields to compensate for the added risk.  As a result, bond prices fall and yields rise, which increases the net cost of borrowing. The term refers to the (alleged) ability of the bond market to serve as a restraint on the government's ability to over-spend and over-borrow.

United States

Clinton administration
From October 1993 to November 1994 US 10-year yields climbed from 5.2% to just over 8.0% fueled by concerns about federal spending in what became informally known as the "Great Bond Massacre." With some guidance from Robert Rubin, the United States Secretary of the Treasury, the Clinton administration and Congress made an effort to reduce the deficit, and 10-year yields dropped to approximately 4% by November 1998.

Clinton political adviser James Carville said at the time, "I used to think that if there was reincarnation, I wanted to come back as the president or the pope or as a .400 baseball hitter. But now I would like to come back as the bond market. You can intimidate everybody."

Obama administration
During the Obama administration some suggest that bond vigilantes were making a return with worries over sustainability and budgetary responsibility. Mark MacQueen, a partner and money manager at Sage Advisory Services Ltd., based in Austin, Texas, said, "The vigilante group is different this time around. It’s major foreign creditors. This whole idea that we need to spend our way out of our problems is being questioned." However, economist Paul Krugman and other New Keynesians pointed out that there was no evidence for bond vigilante activity by pointing out the fact that 10-year yields remained quite low.

United Kingdom 

Bond vigilantes have been described as partly responsible for the British government headed by Liz Truss's U-turn on its proposed mini-budget, which would have greatly increased disposable income by cutting taxes across the board. As a result of the proposed plan, the British pound fell to its all time low against the dollar and government bond yields rose to multi-year highs, forcing the Bank of England to intervene and causing Liz Truss to sack then Chancellor of the Exchequer Kwasi Kwarteng. After new Chancellor of the Exchequer Jeremy Hunt announced the plan would be scrapped on 17 October, bond markets began to stabilize.

Eurozone
During the eurozone crisis that started in 2009, bond vigilantes were blamed for pushing up the government borrowing in the periphery countries. However, many economists agree with Ed Yardeni, who coined the term "bond Vigilantes" in the 1980s, that actions of central banks are able to keep rates low against the pressure of bond vigilantes.

References

Fiscal policy
Vigilantism
Bond market